The 2000 OFC Nations Cup was an international football tournament that was held in Papeete, Tahiti from 19 to 28 June 2000. The 6 national teams involved in the tournament were required to register a squad of players; only players in these squads were eligible to take part in the tournament.  The 2000 Melanesia Cup and the 2000 Polynesia Cup were used to find the four qualifiers for the finals tournament (Fiji and Solomon Islands from Melanesia and Tahiti and Cook Islands from Polynesia respectively), to move on and join Australia and New Zealand at the main tournament. Vanuatu (as the Melanesian 3rd placer) replaced Fiji in the final tournament, due to civil unrest in Fiji following the 2000 Fijian coup d'état.

Players marked (c) were named as captain for their national squad. Players' club teams and players' age are as of 19 June 2000 – the tournament's opening day.

Squad lists

Australia
Coach: Frank Farina

Cook Islands
Coach:  Alan Taylor

New Zealand
Coach:  Ken Dugdale

Solomon Islands
Coach:  George Cowie

Tahiti
Coach:  Leon Gardikiotis

Vanuatu
Coach:  Juan Carlos Buzzetti

Player representation

By club nationality 

Nations in italics are not represented by their national teams in the finals.

By representatives of domestic league

References

squads
OFC Nations Cup squads